Honey is a sweet, edible fluid produced by bees.

Honey or Honeys may also refer to:

Places

United States
 Honey Lake, California
 Honey Branch, a tributary of the Stony Brook in New Jersey
 Honey Creek (Pennsylvania)
 Honey Hill, South Carolina, site of the American Civil War Battle of Honey Hill
 Honey Creek (Texas), a number of streams (and other entities)

Elsewhere
 Honey, Puebla, a town and municipality in the Mexican state of Puebla
 Mount Honey, Campbell Island, New Zealand

People
 Honey (surname)
 Honey Craven (1904–2003), American equestrian, ringmaster and horse show manager
 Honey Irani (born 1950), Indian film actress and screenwriter
 Honey Lantree, drummer of the English beat/pop group The Honeycombs 
 Honey Mahogany (born 1983), American drag performer
 Honey Piazza (born 1952), American blues piano player
 Honey Rose (born 1991), Indian film actress
 Honey Singh (born 1983), Indian rapper, singer, music producer and actor

Arts, entertainment, and media
 Honey (magazine), a British women's magazine published 1960–1986
Honey, a U.S. women's magazine founded by Harris Publications in 1999
 Honey So Sweet (Japanese title "Honey"), a 2012 manga series by Amu Meguro
Honey (TV channel), African lifestyle channel

 The Honeys (play), by Roald Dahl
 Honey (Fear the Walking Dead), an episode of the television series Fear the Walking Dead

Characters
 Honey (Camp Lazlo), a character from the animated television series Camp Lazlo
 Honey, the girlfriend of the Warner Bros. cartoon character Bosko
 Honey, a playable character in the video game Fighting Vipers
 Mitsukuni Haninozuka, a character nicknamed Honey from the manga and anime series Ouran High School Host Club
 Honey, a character in the anime series Space Dandy
 Honey Bunny, associated with Bugs Bunny
 Honey Huan, in the comic strip Doonesbury
 Honey Kisaragi, the title character of the anime and manga Cutie Honey
 Honey Mitchell, in the soap opera EastEnders
 Honey Ryder, in the James Bond film Dr. No
 Honey West, in novels and a television series
 Honey Wilkes, the sister of Ashley Wilkes in the novel Gone with the Wind and film

Films
 Honey (1930 film), an American comedy film
 Honey (1981 film), an Italian sex comedy film starring Clio Goldsmith
 Honey (2003 film), an American dance film starring Jessica Alba
 Honey (2010 film), a Turkish drama film directed by Semih Kaplanoğlu

Music

Groups
 Honey (band), a late 1990s and early 2000s Christian ambient rock and alt/pop rock band
 The Honeys, an American surf rock girl group formed in 1963

Albums
 Honey (Andy Williams album), 1968
 Honey (Bobby Goldsboro album), 1968
 Honey (Chara album), 2008
 Honey (Jimmy McGriff album), 1968
 Honey (Kara album), 2009
 Honey (Katy B album), 2016
 Honey (Ohio Players album), 1975
 Honey (Open Hand album), 2010
 Honey (Robert Palmer album), 1994
 Honey (Robyn album), 2018
 Honey (Scandal album), 2018
 Honey (Sonny James album), 1958
 Honey: Music from & Inspired by the Motion Picture, the soundtrack to the 2003 film Honey
 Honey (Brother Sundance EP), 2017
 Honey (Lay EP), 2019
 Honeys (album), by Pissed Jeans, 2013

Songs
 "Honey" (Erykah Badu song), 2007
 "Honey" (Mariah Carey song), 1997
 "Honey" (Bobby Goldsboro song), 1968
 "Honey" (Jay-Z and R. Kelly song), 2002
 "Honey" (Kehlani song), 2017
 "Honey" (L'Arc-en-Ciel song), 1998
 "Honey" (Moby song), 1998
 "Honey" (Robyn song), 2018
 "Honey" (Rudy Vallée song), 1945
 "Honey (Open That Door)", by Ricky Skaggs, 1984
 "Honey", by America from the album Your Move
 "Honey", by Aretha Franklin from the album Greatest Hits: 1980–1994
 "Honey", by Bonnie McKee from the album Trouble
 "Honey", by Girls' Generation from the album Girls' Generation
 "Honey", by The Hush Sound from the album Goodbye Blues
 "Honey", by Kara from the Pretty Girl Special Edition EP
 "Honey", by Kesha from the album High Road
 "Honey", by Lovers Electric from the album Whatever You Want
 "Honey", by Spacemen 3 from the album Playing with Fire
 "Honey", by the band System of a Down
 "Honey", by King Gizzard & the Lizard Wizard from the album K.G.

Other uses
 Honey (company), a browser extension that automatically applies coupon codes to purchases
 Honey, a term of endearment

See also
 Honey Honey, the main character of the anime and manga Honey Honey no Suteki na Bouken
 "Honey, Honey", a 1974 song by ABBA
 Alana "Honey Boo Boo" Thompson, child reality show star on the show Here Comes Honey Boo Boo
 HNNY, pronounced "honey", a Swedish house music producer and DJ
 Honeyz, a British-based R&B girl group formed in 1997
 Honi (disambiguation)